Theodosia is an English-language fantasy adventure television series produced by ZDF and Cottonwood Media based on the children's novels by Robin LaFevers.

Presented at the 2021 MIPCOM, the series first premiered in the United States on HBO Max on March 10, 2022, followed by the premieres on CBBC on April 25 and Globoplay on June 21, 2022.

Premise
The series follows the titular Theodosia "Theo" Throckmorton (Eloise Little), the 14-year-old daughter of two Egyptologists (Rik Young and Elisa Doughty) in 1906 who run and live at London's Museum of Legends and Antiquities. Theo and her younger brother Henry (Frankie Minchella) stumble on a hidden tomb and a mysterious artifact, the Eye of Horus.

Cast

Main
 Eloise Little as Theodosia "Theo" Throckmorton
 Yasmina El-Abd as Safiya
 Nana Agyeman-Bediako as Will Morgan
 Frankie Minchella as Henry Throckmorton

Supporting
 Rik Young as Alistair Throckmorton
 Elisa Doughty as Henrietta Throckmorton

Recurring
 Estrid Barton as Lady Throckmorton
 Momo Yeung as Miss Krait
 Anthony J. Abraham as Artie
 Charlie Cattrall as Yaret the Chief Serpent
 Olivia Barrowclough as Nigella
 Nahid Leadar as Queen Hatshepsut

Production

Development
Following the final season of Find Me in Paris, it was announced in February 2021 that ZDF and Cottonwood Media would be collaborating again, this time to adapt Robin LaFevers's Theodosia novels for television. Early buyers included HBO Max and Globoplay. Executive producers include head writer Joe Williams and Cottonwood's Leila Smith. Also representing Cottonwood are producers David Michel, Cécile Lauritano, and Zoé Carrera Allaix.

In October 2022, it was announced ZDF had greenlit a second season of Theodosia.

Cast
It was announced Eloise Little would star as the titular role. Also joining the cast were Nana Agyeman-Bediako and Yasmina El-Abd. The trailer, released in late February 2022, confirmed Rik Young and Elisa Doughty would be playing Theo's parents.

Filming
Principal photography commenced in April 2021 and wrapped that October, taking place in Paris and Brussels. Parts of the cities, such as back alleys, were used to recreate Edwardian London. The series was shot by directors Matthias Hoene, Alex Jacob, and Matt Bloom. Production on the second season is underway in France, Belgium, and Morocco.

References

External links

2020s children's television series
2022 French television series debuts
2022 German television series debuts
Children's adventure television series
English-language television shows
French children's television series
French fantasy television series
German children's television series
German fantasy television series
Globoplay original programming
HBO Max original programming
Television series about the history of Egypt
Television series about teenagers
Television series set in the 1900s
Television shows based on American novels
Television series based on Egyptian mythology
Television shows filmed in Belgium
Television shows filmed in Paris
Television shows set in Egypt
Television shows set in London